Seven Women (Spanish:Siete Mujeres) is a 1953 Mexican drama film directed by Juan Bustillo Oro and starring Amelia Bence, Alma Rosa Aguirre and Bárbara Gil. It is based on a play of the same name which had previously been adapted into the 1944 Argentine film Seven Women.

The film's sets were designed by the art director Manuel Fontanals.

Plot summary

Cast
 Alma Rosa Aguirre 
 Amelia Bence 
 Conchita Gentil Arcos 
 Bárbara Gil 
 Maruja Grifell
 Prudencia Grifell 
 Sara Guasch 
 Anabelle Gutiérrez 
 Queta Lavat 
 Bertha Lehar 
 Abel Salazar

References

Bibliography 
 Emilio García Riera. Historia del cine mexicano. Secretaría de Educación Pública, 1986.

External links 
 

1953 films
1953 drama films
Mexican drama films
1950s Spanish-language films
Films directed by Juan Bustillo Oro
Mexican black-and-white films
1950s Mexican films